Eynsham Hall is a Grade II listed mansion near North Leigh in Oxfordshire, England. The original house dating from the 1770s was largely rebuilt in the early 20th century by Ernest George. After use as a country house and venue for hunting parties it became a maternity hospital rest and relaxation centre during World War II and then a police training centre. It is now used as a hotel and conference centre.

The three storey limestone building is surrounded by extensive parkland and has terraced gardens. Many of the outbuildings, including the former game larder, are also listed buildings. North Leigh F.C. play in the grounds of the hall.

History 
Built around the 1770s as a Georgian house, with extensive parkland. It was built for the Lacy family and sold in 1778 to Robert Langford. By 1814 it was owned by Thomas Parker and leased for hunting parties. It was enlarged, with an additional upper floor, by Charles Barry in the mid 19th century and various outbuildings added. A fourth floor was added to designs by Owen Jones in the 1870s.

The Georgian house was demolished in 1904 and rebuilt as a Jacobean style mansion in 1906–8 by Ernest George, for the Mason family, who had taken up residence in 1866. The house and estate included its own electric generating station, waterworks and gas plant, and a private telephone system linked the house to various outbuildings around the estate. Previous residents include Willoughby Lacey, Robert Langford, James Duberley, Sir Thomas Parker and Sir Thomas Bazley.

During World War II, a section of Eynsham Hall was used as a maternity ward for expectant mothers evacuated from London, and the Canadian artist Anthony J. Batten was born there in 1940. Referred to as the "flak shack", the Hall was also used for rest and relaxation (R & R) by the U.S. Army Air Corps officers. The American Red Cross ran the R & R programme, and recreational activities included reading, bridge, snooker and table tennis.

The site was used as a police training centre by the Home Office from 1946. Currently it is owned by the Cathedral Group and used as a conference and training centre.

The Gun Room won a European Hotel Design Award in 2008 

In the grounds of Eynsham Hall there are earthworks of an Iron Age hill fort which is also called Green Wood fort.

Architecture

The three storey limestone building is laid out in an "H" plan. At the centre of the front of the building is a porch with a door and tympanum with Ionic columns to the upper floors and a coat of arms. The garden front also has an armorial panel above the parapet. The interior includes oak panelling and stone fireplaces.

The north lodge with its attached walls, gates and gatepiers were built in 1845 by Charles Barry.

The former game larder and dairy were built by the architect Charles Henry Howell in 1883.

Some of the exotic species were planted by Robert Marnock in the 1860s. The lake was added in 1866 and provided a water supply to the house.

References

External links 

 

Country houses in Oxfordshire
Grade II listed buildings in Oxfordshire
West Oxfordshire District